Fitzgilbert is a Norman French surname. It is patronymic, since the prefix Fitz- derives from the Latin filius, meaning "son of." Its variants include the alternate forms FitzGilbert, Fitz Gilbert, Fitz-Gilbert, fitz Gilbert, and the given name turned surname Gilbert or Gilberts. Fitzgilbert is rare as a given name. People with the name include:

 Baldwin FitzGilbert (died 1086-1091), Norman nobleman
 John Fitz Gilbert or John Marshal (Marshal of England) (c. 1105–1165), minor Anglo-Norman nobleman
 Richard fitz Gilbert (before 1035–c. 1090), Norman lord who participated in the Norman conquest of England
 Walter fitz Gilbert of Cadzow (died c. 1346), Scottish nobleman
 William FitzGilbert, fifteenth Lord Chancellor of England, from 1141 to 1142
 William de Lancaster I (died c. 1170), English nobleman also known as William Fitz Gilbert

References

See also
 Richard Fitz Gilbert de Clare (died 1136), Anglo-Norman nobleman
 Fitz
 Gilbert (given name)

Norman-language surnames
Patronymic surnames
Surnames from given names